The 1954 UK & Ireland Greyhound Racing Year was the 29th year of greyhound racing in the United Kingdom and Ireland.

Roll of honour

Summary
Spanish Battleship secured a second consecutive Irish Greyhound Derby title becoming the first greyhound in history to do so. In addition to the Derby win, during the year he won the Tostal Cup at Harold's Cross Stadium and Easter Cup at Shelbourne Park before an injury curtailed his efforts in the Callanan Cup final. After his historic Derby win he would win the Tipperary Cup with two track record runs and a victory in the McCalmont Cup but would be a shock loser in the final of the McAlinden Cup for the second year running. Pauls Fun won the English Greyhound Derby for Leslie Reynolds securing a record fifth title for the trainer.

The annual totalisator was £56,139,001.

Competitions
Prince Lawrence and Ardskeagh Ville claimed the pre-derby classics, the Grand National and Gold Collar respectively. Jack Harvey went on a significant three classic winning run; his Gold Collar finalist Demon King captured the sprinters classic the Scurry Gold Cup. The following month during the Laurels, at Wimbledon Stadium Coolkill Chieftain picked up the £1,000 first prize and then in September his Laurels runner up Pancho Villa secured a four and half-length victory in the St Leger final. In addition he also won the Puppy Derby with Gulf of Darien.

The Scottish Greyhound Derby moved to October in an attempt to gain more entries and this seemed to work when the competition received a good entry, including a pair of brothers who emerged to dominate the event. Rushton Mac (by Rushton News out of Rushton Panda) defeated his brother Rushton Spot, who was eliminated from the English Derby at the semi-final stage. Rushton Mac had previously won the Edinburgh Cup. The kennel brothers were trained by Frank Johnson and Rushton Mac won the Pall Mall Stakes and Select Stakes titles.

West Ham Stadium received a star studded line up for the Cesarewitch final in October. Matchlock beat a field in the final by seven lengths that included Derby champion Pauls Fun, St Leger champion Pancho Villa, Title Role and Barrowside. The last major event of the year was the Grand Prix and the Rushton brothers took the first two places again, only this time in a reversal of the Scottish Derby final.

Kensington Perfection trained by Bill Higgins at Oxford Stadium completed an impressive four timer by winning four National Produce stakes finals at Stamford Bridge, Catford Stadium, Brighton & Hove Greyhound Stadium (The Regency) and Eastville Stadium.

Tracks
A new track in Weymouth opened during August; the site was on Radpole Lane and was known as the Wessex Stadium and Somercotes opened the following month. Stanley Greyhound Stadium withdrew from the National Greyhound Racing Club under the 'Combine' licence.

Principal UK races

Totalisator returns

The totalisator returns declared to the licensing authorities for the year 1954 are listed below. Tracks that did not have a totalisator in operation are not listed.

References 

Greyhound racing in the United Kingdom
Greyhound racing in the Republic of Ireland
UK and Ireland Greyhound Racing Year
UK and Ireland Greyhound Racing Year
UK and Ireland Greyhound Racing Year
UK and Ireland Greyhound Racing Year